Peter Thomas Gaynor (born 1958) is an American Certified Emergency Manager who served briefly as acting Secretary of Homeland Security under President Trump.
Gaynor previously served as administrator of the Federal Emergency Management Agency (FEMA). He was appointed as Acting Administrator by President Donald Trump on March 8, 2019, and became Administrator on January 16, 2020.

Gaynor assumed the role of Acting Secretary of Homeland Security on January 12, 2021, upon the resignation of Chad Wolf. Gaynor was succeeded as Acting DHS Secretary by David Pekoske on January 20, 2021, after President Biden's inauguration.

Education

Gaynor, who grew up in Warwick, Rhode Island, graduated from Pilgrim High School in 1977, and subsequently enlisted in the Marine Corps. He later attended Community College of Rhode Island from 1982 to 1984, and Rhode Island College from 1984 to 1986, graduating with a BA in History. While in the Marines, he earned an MA in National Security and Strategic Studies from the U.S. Naval War College in 2001. He completed the Executive Leaders Program at the Naval Postgraduate School in 2013.

Career
Gaynor served in the U.S. Marine Corps for 26 years, retiring with the rank of lieutenant colonel. He was the executive officer responsible for the security of Camp David; was the head of Plans, Policy, and Operations at the Headquarters, Marine Corps, during the September 11 attacks; and deployed with the 1st Marine Expeditionary Force where he coordinated combat operations in Al Anbar Province, Iraq, for multinational and Marine forces.

From March 2008 to December 2014, Gaynor was the director of the Providence Emergency Management Agency and Office of Homeland Security. A colleague there describes him as being prepared for anything and respectful of the chain of command because of his military experience.

From January 2015 to October 2018, Gaynor was the director of the Rhode Island Emergency Management Agency (RIEMA). During that time, RIEMA responded to numerous small and large disasters, including one presidentially declared disaster and at least seven pre-existing active federal disasters. Gaynor oversaw response and recovery efforts to blizzards, floods, tropical storms and public health emergencies. He also coordinated evacuations, mass care, special events, and school safety.

FEMA

Gaynor was confirmed by the Senate on October 11, 2018, as the deputy administrator of the Federal Emergency Management Agency (FEMA).

On March 8, 2019, when Administrator Brock Long returned to the private sector, Gaynor became acting administrator. Gaynor was in charge of the agency's recovery efforts for many disasters, including the California wildfires, tornado outbreaks, severe storms, flooding in the Midwest and the Puerto Rico earthquakes. On January 14, 2020, the Senate confirmed Gaynor as administrator with a vote of 81 to 8. He was sworn in two days later.

Acting Secretary
With the resignation of Chad Wolf in January 2021, Gaynor became the acting Secretary of Homeland Security on January 12, 2021.

References

External links

Peter T. Gaynor biography at FEMA

|-

1958 births
Community College of Rhode Island alumni
Federal Emergency Management Agency officials
Living people
Naval War College alumni
Rhode Island College alumni
Trump administration cabinet members
United States Marine Corps officers